John Harald Norbelie (October 5, 1944 – September 6, 2015) was a Swedish journalist and writer. His writing mainly focused on Stockholm's local history and culture. After being diagnosed with prostate cancer in 2004, Norbeile became a vocal proponent of euthanasia. In that capacity his main argument was that assisting a terminal ill patient to die might be a better choice than requiring that the patient continued to suffer.

References 

1944 births
2015 deaths
Swedish journalists
Swedish male writers
Euthanasia activists
Deaths from cancer in Sweden
Deaths from prostate cancer